Crobylophora is a genus of moths in the family Lyonetiidae.

Selected species
Crobylophora chrysidiella Meyrick, 1880 
Crobylophora daricella Meyrick, 1881
Crobylophora metallifera (Walsingham, 1891)
Crobylophora onychotis Meyrick 1915 (India)
Crobylophora psammosticta Turner, 1923
Crobylophora siglias Meyrick 1911 (India)
Crobylophora staterias Meyrick 1905 (India, Ceylon)
Crobylophora xanthochyta Meyrick, 1918

External links
Butterflies and Moths of the World Generic Names and their Type-species

Lyonetiidae
Moth genera